Satyadev Narayan Arya (born 1 July 1939) is the current and 19th  Governor of Tripura. He also served as 16th governor of Haryana. He is a leader of Bharatiya Janata Party from Bihar. He is a former Minister of Mines and Geology of Bihar. He is an eight-time winning Member of Bihar Legislative Assembly from Rajgir.

Personal life
Arya was born on 1 July 1939 in Gandhi Tola in Rajgir of Nalanda district in Bihar Province of British India to Shivan Prasad and Sundari Devi. He received his Masters of Arts and LLB degrees from Patna University. Arya is married to Sarswati Devi, with whom he has three sons and two daughters.

Political career
Arya was the President SC Cell BJP, Bihar from 1988-1998 as well as the Treasurer, All India Schedule Caste Front. An eight time Member of Bihar Vidhan Sabha from Rajgir, he was the Minister of Rural Development from 1979 to '80, Minister of  Mines & Geology in 2010.

References

|-

|-

Bihar MLAs 2010–2015
State cabinet ministers of Bihar
People from Nalanda district
Living people
Bharatiya Janata Party politicians from Bihar
1937 births
Governors of Haryana
Governors of Tripura